A Painter's Wife Portrait is a 1981 Soviet romance film directed by Aleksandr Pankratov.

Plot 
The film tells about a family who goes to rest in a boarding house. The wife thinks that she is stopping her husband from doing creativity, and she begins to flirt with another man.

Cast 
 Valentina Telichkina as Nina
 Sergey Shakurov as Pavel Alekseyevich
 Nikita Mikhalkov as Boris Petrovich
 Mikhail Semakov as Ivan 
  Vsevolod Shilovsky as Mitrofanych  
 Oleg Golubitsky as Nikolay Nikitenko  
 Tatyana Konyukhova as Varya Nikitenko  
 Ekaterina Sukhanova as Lena  
 Olga Gobzeva as Asya 
 Viktor Uralskiy as Viktor Sergunov

References

External links 
 

1981 films
1980s Russian-language films
Soviet romantic drama films
Mosfilm films
Films based on works by Yuri Nagibin

Films about fictional painters
1981 romantic drama films